La Fonderie, Brussels Museum of Industry and Labour is a museum of industrial history in Brussels, Belgium. It collects objects, documents and oral history on the city’s industrial past and visualises the working history of Brussels.

The museum is located at 27, / in Molenbeek-Saint-Jean, on the site of the former foundry of La Compagnie des Bronzes de Bruxelles (1854–1979), close to the Brussels–Charleroi Canal. It is managed as a nonprofit organisation focusing on analysing and exhibiting the economic and social history of the Brussels region. It publishes a magazine, organises guided tours and provides educational activities. La Fonderie also houses a documentation centre open to the public.

Exhibits
The museum presents four key industry sectors that have created or transformed products made in Brussels: the metal industry, woodworking, textile manufacturing and food processing. Each module includes two showcase machines that represent the technology and the companies that made and used them as well as the working conditions. The exhibits are mainly from the museum's own collections but also from those of partner institutions and private collectors. The permanent exhibition is since 2001 in the 300 m² lathe room of the former Compagnie des Bronzes. Temporary exhibitions are shown in the top floor of the museum and additional exhibits of various industry sectors are planned to be shown in coming years.

La Fonderie supplements the exhibitions of the major museums in Brussels. The bilingual French and Dutch exhibition addresses those interested in sociology and technology as well as local history. An English manual is available which includes translations of the captions of the exhibits.

References

External links

 Museum website

Museums with year of establishment missing
Museums in Brussels
Industry museums in Belgium
Labour in Belgium
History of Brussels